The following is a timeline of the history of the city of Vicenza in the Veneto region of Italy.

Prior to 18th century

 2nd-6th century - Roman Catholic Diocese of Vicenza established.
 569 - Lombards in power.(it)
 825 - Regional school established in Vicenza.
 1117 - Earthquake.
 1160 -  (church) tower rebuilt.
 1167 - Vicenza joins the Lombard League.
 13th century -  built.
 1260 - Santa Corona church construction begins.
 1280 -  (church) construction begins.
 1311 - Scaligeri of Verona in power.
 1380 - Public clock installed (approximate date).
 1387 - Visconti of Milan in power.
 1404 - Vicenza becomes part of the Republic of Venice (until 1797).
 1440 -  built.
 1474 - Printing press in operation.
 1549 - Basilica (town hall) Palladian remodelling begins.
 1550 - Palazzo Chiericati construction begins.
 1552 - Palazzo Thiene built.
 1555 -  (learned society) founded.
 1566
 Palazzo Valmarana built.
 Villa Capra "La Rotonda" construction begins near city.
 1585 - Teatro Olimpico (theatre) opens.
 1614 - Basilica (town hall) Palladian completed.

18th-19th centuries
 1708 - Biblioteca Civica Bertoliana (library) opens.
 1814 - Austrians in power.
 1833 -  (cemetery) established.
 1842 - 25 March: Future writer Antonio Fogazzaro born in Vicenza.
 1846 - Padua–Vicenza railway begins operating.
 1848 -  (cemetery) established.
 1851 - Vicenza railway station in operation.
 1866 - Vicenza becomes part of the Kingdom of Italy.
 1876
  (railway) begins operating.
 Il Berico newspaper begins publication.
 1877 -  (railway) begins operating.
 1884 - Horse-drawn  begins operating.
 1892 - Banca Cattolica Vicentina (Catholic bank) established.
 1897 - Population: 42,020.

20th century

 1901 - Population (commune): 47,558. 
 1902 - Vicenza Calcio football club formed.
 1906 -  (transit entity) formed.
 1910 - Electric tram begins operating.
 1911 - Population: 54,555.
 1920 -  becomes mayor.
 1921 - Vicenza Airport built.
 1928 -  begins operating.
 1931 - Population: 65,177.
 1935 - Stadio Romeo Menti (stadium) opens.
 1944 - Bombing of Vicenza in World War II.
 1945 - Il Giornale di Vicenza newspaper in publication.
 1948 -  becomes mayor.
 1951 -  (transit entity) formed.
 1961 - Population: 98,019.
 1962 -  becomes mayor.
 1971 - Population: 116,620.
 1978 - TVA Vicenza (television) begins broadcasting.
 1990 - Achille Variati becomes mayor.
 1998 -  becomes mayor.

21st century

 2008 - Achille Variati becomes mayor again.
 2010 - .(it)
 2013 - Population: 113,639.

See also
 
 List of mayors of Vicenza, 1866-present
 , 12th-19th centuries
 List of bishops of Vicenza (it)
 
 
 
 Timeline of the Republic of Venice, of which Vicenza was part 1404-1797
 Veneto history (it) (region)

Timelines of other cities in the macroregion of Northeast Italy:(it)
 Emilia-Romagna region: Timeline of Bologna; Ferrara; Forlì; Modena; Parma; Piacenza; Ravenna; Reggio Emilia; Rimini
 Friuli-Venezia Giulia region: Timeline of Trieste
 Trentino-South Tyrol region: Timeline of Trento
 Veneto region: Timeline of Padua; Treviso; Venice; Verona

References

This article incorporates information from the Italian Wikipedia.

Bibliography

in English
 
 
 
 
 
 
  (+ 1870 ed.)

in Italian

 B. Pagliarini. Croniche di Vicenza, 1663
  1783-1785
 
 
 B. Morsolin. Fonti della storia di Vicenza, 1880
  (bibliography)
 
 S. Rumor. Bibliografia storica della città e provincia di Vicenza, 1916

External links

  (city archives)
 Archivio di Stato di Vicenza (state archives)
 Items related to Vicenza, various dates (via Europeana)
 Items related to Vicenza, various dates (via Digital Public Library of America)

Vicenza
Vicenza
vicenza